is the 2015 entry of the Super Hero Taisen film series, featuring the cast of Kamen Rider Drive and the appearance of Kamen Rider 3, which was originally created by Shotaro Ishinomori for the one-shot 1972 manga . Tetsuo Kurata, (Kamen Rider Black, Kamen Rider Black RX), Yuichi Nakamura (Kamen Rider Den-O), Kousei Amano, Takayuki Tsubaki, Ryoji Morimoto and Takahiro Hojo (Kamen Rider Blade), and Kento Handa (Kamen Rider 555) reprise their roles in the film, which opened in theaters on March 21, 2015. A new actor Mitsuhiro Oikawa, confirmed to perform his role as Kamen Rider 3, as well as the cast of Shuriken Sentai Ninninger will also appear.

Plot
The film begins on February 10, 1973, when the final episode of the original Kamen Rider series was aired on television, but just after Kamen Riders 1 and 2 destroy Shocker for good, they are attacked and defeated by another Rider who calls himself Kamen Rider 3, triggering a green shockwave.

In the present, just after Shinosuke Tomari as Kamen Rider Drive defeats a Roidmude, the shockwave hits the city and all the scenery around turns into an alternate reality where Shocker rules Japan and the Kamen Riders are treated as rebels except by those who sided with them, who are now named as Shocker Riders instead, with only Kiriko Shijima, protected by the Signal Legend Faiz, realizing the change, but everyone else, including Shinosuke, believing that nothing is odd. Some time later, Kotaro Minami as Kamen Rider Black fights some members of Shocker to rescue some children, but Shinosuke, now a Shocker Rider, appears to assist them against Kotaro. When the members of Shocker attack the children to distract Kotaro and defeat him, Kiriko realizes that Kotaro is an ally and takes him away, pretending that she is taking him under custody. After a short encounter with Kamen Rider 3, Shinosuke confronts Kiriko for harboring a fugitive, and Kotaro explains to him that history was changed after Kamen Rider 3 defeated Kamen Riders 1 and 2, creating an alternate future where Shocker triumphed, and that he himself was a Shocker Rider until his righteousness awakened his true memories, just before Shocker attacks them, and Kotaro apparently sacrifices himself to allow Shinosuke and Kiriko to escape.

Back to their base, Shinosuke and Kiriko discover that their boss Jun Honganji was killed by officer Genpachiro Otta after he defended them, and awakens as a Kamen Rider. While Drive confronts Genpachiro, transformed into a Shocker monster, Kiriko is kidnapped and their captors demand Drive to surrender, but Kiriko urges him to keep fighting instead and falls from atop a building to her death, much to Shinosuke's despair, until Kamen Rider 3 appears and rescues him. After escaping, Kamen Rider 3 reveals himself to Shinosuke as Kyoichiro Kuroi, and that like him, he awakened as a Kamen Rider. He also affirms that despite having their bodies destroyed, Kamen Riders 1 and 2's souls are contained in artificial brains at Rider Town, where all the Riders who oppose Shocker gather. Accompanied by Kiriko's brother Go, they set off to Rider Town, joined on the way by Yuto Sakurai, while Shinosuke leaves the group midway to make his own investigation about the situation, assisted by his friends Kyu Saijo and Rinna.

Evading capture from the Shocker Riders on some occasions, Go, Yuto and Kyoichiro end up in an ambush just before reaching Rider Town. In the occasion, one of the Shocker Riders, Takumi Inui affirms to Go that Kyoichiro is lying, while Kyoichiro holds the Shocker Riders to allow Yuto to proceed and meet the brains of Kamen Rider 1 and 2, just to discover that he fell into a trap by the Great Leader of Shocker. Kyoichiro then reveals that he was always a Shocker Rider since the beginning, and that he joined the organization by his own volition, instead of being kidnapped like his predecessors. Having realized Kyoichiro's intention by his own investigation, Shinosuke appears, but when Kiriko, who is revealed to be still alive, is used as a hostage against him, Shinosuke challenges the Shocker Riders on a race, promising to surrender if he loses, but demanding them to release Kiriko and the children in their custody should he wins. Taking advantage of Kyoichiro's pride, Shinosuke convinces him to accept the challenge.

In the next day, Shinosuke has a race against Kyoichiro and several other Shocker Riders in their vehicles, in front of a huge audience, including Shocker and the captives Yuto and Kiriko. During the race, he is attacked by the other competitors, including Mashin Chaser, who appears to fight him, but Kotaro, now able to transform into Kamen Rider Black RX, Go and a reformed Takumi step in to help him. In the end, Shinosuke wins against Kyoichiro by a small margin, but Shocker refuses to keep their part of the bargain, and when they decide to attack the children who, inspired by the Kamen Riders, cheer for them, the adults rebel against Shocker as well. Shinosuke then attempts to convince Kyoichiro to reform as well, but the Great Leader of Shocker's brain appears and absorbs Kyoichiro, creating the massive Rider Robo, and proceeds to use the machine created to alter the world to erase all Kamen Riders from history, until Kyoichiro forces himself out of it. Soon after, the Ninningers appear and with help from Yoshitaka Igasaki, Shinosuke transforms his car, Tridoron into an Otomonin, which combines with the Ninningers' Otomonin to form Shurikenzin Tridoron and together, they destroy the Rider Robo, reverting history to its original course, but soon after, Go is killed while fighting the remaining Shocker members which inspire the restored Kamen Riders to defeat them.

After everything returns to normal, Yuto reveals to Shinosuke that Kyoichiro still exists even after history was restored, giving him a little relief while he and Kiriko mourn Go's death.

Cast
Kamen Rider Series cast
: 
: 
: 
: 
: 
: 
: 
: 
: 
: 
: 

Ninninger cast
: 
: 
: 
: 
: 
: 

Super Hero Taisen GP cast
: 
: 
: 
: 
: 
: 

Voice Cast
: 
, Drive Driver Equipment Voice: 
: 
: 
: 
: 
: 
: 
: 
Faiz Driver Equipment Voice: 
Rouzer Voice: 
Kabuto Zecter Voice: 
Sengoku Driver Equipment Voice: 
Ninninger Equipment Voice: 
Narration, :

Theme song
"Who's That Guy"
Lyrics: Shoko Fujibayashi
Composition & Arrangement: SAKOSHIN
Artist: Mitsuhiro Oikawa

Kamen Rider 4
The first million ticket buyers received a special DVD featuring the first episode of the three episode series, titled  that is a sequel to Super Hero Taisen GP: Kamen Rider 3. d-Video began distribution of the first two episodes on March 28, 2015 and the final episode on April 4, 2015. Mitsuru Karahashi (Kamen Rider 555) reprises his role in the series. Mitsuru Matsuoka performs his voice role as Kamen Rider 4 and also performs the series's theme song "time" under the special band Mitsuru Matsuoka EARNEST DRIVE. The series is directed by Kyohei Yamaguchi and written by Nobuhiro Mouri.

Reception

Super Hero Taisen GP: Kamen Rider 3 grossed $45,911 at the box office.

References

External links

Kamen Rider Drive
Kamen Rider Blade
Dystopian films
Films set in 1973
Films set in 2015
Crossover tokusatsu films
2010s Japanese-language films
2010s Kamen Rider films
Films directed by Takayuki Shibasaki